Jahazpur is one of the 200 Rajasthan Legislative Assembly constituencies, of Rajasthan, in northern India. It is centered around the city of Jahazpur, in Bhilwara district. It is part of Bhilwara Lok Sabha/Parliamentary constituency.

References

External links 
 www.Jahazpur.com

Cities and towns in Bhilwara district
Assembly constituencies of Rajasthan